White's Chapel United Methodist Church is a historic church in rural St. Landry Parish, Louisiana. It was built in 1894 and added to the National Register in 1983.

References

United Methodist churches in Louisiana
Churches on the National Register of Historic Places in Louisiana
Gothic Revival church buildings in Louisiana
Churches completed in 1894
Churches in St. Landry Parish, Louisiana
National Register of Historic Places in St. Landry Parish, Louisiana